Michael David Rhoades (born September 21, 1972) is an American basketball coach.  He is the head men's basketball coach at Virginia Commonwealth University (VCU), a position he has held since 2017.  Rhoades served as the head men's basketball coach at Randolph–Macon College from 1999 to 2009 and Rice University from 2014 to 2017.

Biography

Playing career
Rhoades played college basketball at Lebanon Valley College and led the team to the 1994 Division III national championship.  A shooting guard, he still holds the records for assists, steals, and free-throw percentage.  He also graduated as the college's all-time leading scorer.  Rhoades was an All-American twice, the 1995 Division III national player of the year, and his #5 jersey is retired at LVC.

Coaching career
After a playing career at Lebanon Valley under Pat Flannery, Rhoades accepted his first coaching job at Randolph-Macon in 1996, under Hal Nunnally. Upon Nunnally's retirement in 1999, Rhoades was promoted to head coach at just 25 years old.  He would go 197–76 in 10 seasons, reaching four NCAA Division III Tournaments and two Sweet Sixteens.

In 2009, Rhoades accepted a spot as the associate head coach at VCU . While on the Rams' staff Rhoades was a part of Final Four squad during the 2010-11 season, and part of four-straight NCAA tournament teams.  VCU's record was 137-46 during this period.  The Rams also won the 2010 College Basketball Invitational championship, and the 2012 CAA conference tournament championship.

On March 25, 2014, Rhoades was named the head coach at Rice University, replacing Ben Braun. He engineered a turnaround of the Rice program.  Rice went 12-49 the two prior seasons to Rhoades' arrival.  Rhoades led Rice to an immediate five win improvement from the prior season during his first year at the helm. Rice went 23–12 in Rhoades' third year.  This was Rice's first 20 win season since 2003–04, and the 23 wins are the second-most in program history.  Rhoades also led Rice to the second round of the CBI which was the program's first post season appearance since 2011–12.

On March 21, 2017, Rhoades was named the 12th head coach in program history, at VCU.

Family
Rhoades is the son of former Pennsylvania State Senator James J. Rhoades.

Head coaching record

References

External links
 VCU profile

1972 births
Living people
American men's basketball coaches
American men's basketball players
Basketball coaches from Pennsylvania
Basketball players from Pennsylvania
College men's basketball head coaches in the United States
Lebanon Valley Flying Dutchmen men's basketball players
People from Mahanoy City, Pennsylvania
Randolph–Macon Yellow Jackets men's basketball coaches
Rice Owls men's basketball coaches
VCU Rams men's basketball coaches